Phosphoglycerate may refer to:

 2-Phosphoglycerate
 3-Phosphoglycerate